In Japan, a  is a  salaried worker.  In Japanese popular culture, this is embodied by a white-collar worker who shows overriding loyalty and commitment to the corporation where he works.

Salarymen are expected to work long hours, to put in additional overtime, to participate in after-work leisure activities such as drinking, singing karaoke and visiting hostess bars with colleagues, and to value work over all else. The salaryman typically enters a company after graduating from college and stays with that corporation for the duration of his career.

Other popular notions surrounding salarymen include karōshi, or death from overwork. In conservative Japanese culture, becoming a salaryman is the expected career choice for young men and those who do not take this career path are regarded as living with a stigma and less prestige. On the other hand, the word salaryman is sometimes used with derogatory connotation for his total dependence on his employer and lack of individuality.

History
The word sararīman is often described as wasei-eigo, a Japanese formation from English loanwords, but it appears to instead be a straight borrowing from the English phrase "salaried man", which predates the Japanese term by nearly a century.  The Japanese term saw widespread use by 1930, even before government expansion and militarization drove the growth of white-collar employment. The term does not include all workers who receive a set salary, but only "white-collar workers in the large bureaucracy of a business firm or government office." The term includes those who work for government (e.g., bureaucrats) and major companies (e.g., those listed in Nikkei 225). Workers in the mizu shōbai (nightlife) and entertainment industries (including actors and singers) are not included even though their income may be salary based. Similarly, doctors, engineers, lawyers, accountants, musicians, artists, politicians, freelancers and corporate executives are also excluded.

A typical description of the salaryman is a male white-collar employee who typically earns his salary "based on individual abilities rather than on seniority." Salarymen are known for working many hours, sometimes over eighty hours per week. Oftentimes, because of his busy work schedule, the salaryman does not have time to raise a family and his work becomes a lifelong commitment. Companies typically hire the salarymen straight out of high school, and they are expected to stay with the company until retirement, around the time they reach the age between 55 and 60. As a reward for the demonstration of their loyalty, companies rarely fire the salarymen unless it is under special "dire" circumstances. There is also a belief that the "amount of time spent at the workplace correlates to the perceived efficiency of the employee." As a result of this intense work-driven lifestyle, salarymen may be more likely to suffer from mental or physical health problems, including heart failure or suicide.

Social image 

The prevalence of salarymen in Japanese society has given birth to many depictions by both the Japanese and American media. Some films in Japan about salarymen include Mr. Salaryman, Japanese Salaryman NEO (based on the TV series), and a drama series entitled History of a Salaryman. There is a certain expectation among the middle and upper classes for Japanese people to become salarymen. For many young Japanese men, accepting anything less than becoming a salaryman and conforming to its ideal is considered a failure, not only of him, but of his parents.

The life of a salaryman revolves around work. The activities that he does outside of work typically involve his coworkers, which lessens the distance between him and work.

Entertainment
Changing social circumstances have greatly diversified the life of the salaryman outside of work. Though the importance of social drinking has not declined, its image has changed over time from mass partying during the economic bubble to conservative consumption at home after the collapse of the economy during the 1990s. Mahjong was an immensely popular game among the 1960s generation of salarymen, who brought the game into company circles directly from high school and college groups. The 1970s generation saw a gradual decrease in the number of avid mahjong players, and by the 1980s, it became common to not show any interest at all.

Golf became widely popular during the economic bubble, when golf club passes became useful tools for currying favor with corporate executives. Many mid-level salarymen were pressured into taking up golf to participate in golfing events with their superiors. The collapse of the economic bubble led to the closing of many golf courses, and the ritual of playing golf with executives has become increasingly rare. However, some current salarymen may have golfing experience from their student days, and golf is still acknowledged as an expensive hobby for salarymen.

Karōshi

Extreme pressure on salarymen can lead to death by overwork, or karōshi. Salarymen feel intense pressure to fulfill their duty to support their family because of the gendered expectations placed on men. According to a Washington Post article, the Japanese government attempted for years to set a limit to the number of hours one can work, and the issue has been prevalent since the 1970s. In 2014, after 30 years of activism, Japan's parliament (the Japanese Diet) passed a law "promoting countermeasures against karōshi."

However, many Japanese still criticize the government and believe there should be laws and penalties for companies that violate work hour laws. Approximately 2000 applications are filed by the families of salarymen that die of karōshi. However, the death toll may be much higher, and "as many as 8000 of the 30,000 annual suicides each year are thought to be work-related," with "as many as 10,000 non-suicide karōshi deaths per year."

Karōshi, literally "overwork death," was first diagnosed as a "circulatory disease brought on by stress" in the late 1970s after the 1973 oil crisis, which took a toll on the post-war reconstruction of Japanese industry.  Since then, the number of deaths from overwork has increased, especially at larger and more prestigious companies. In 2002, Kenichi Uchino, a 30-year-old quality-control manager at Toyota, collapsed and died after working over 80 hours unpaid overtime for six months. After this incident, Toyota announced it would begin monitoring their workers' health and pay for all of their overtime hours.

See also
 Hansei
 Japanese blue collar workers
 Japanese management culture
 Japanese work environment
 Salaryman Kintarō
 Simultaneous recruiting of new graduates
 Suicide in Japan

Women
 Kyariaūman, Japanese term for a career woman
 Office lady

General
 The Organization Man
 White-collar worker
 Work–life balance

References

External links

"My Life in Corporate Japan"
A week in the life of a Tokyo salary man
Salarymen: On the Way to Extinction? by Kristin Wingate, Undergraduate Journal of Global Citizenship, vol. 1, no. 1, 2011

Japanese business terms
Society of Japan
Japanese vocabulary
Labor in Japan
Office work
Male stock characters in anime and manga
Wasei-eigo
Employment in Japan